

Events
Giovanni Pierluigi da Palestrina loses his wife in an outbreak of plague.

Bands formed
The  is founded by Alfonso II, Duke of Ferrara.

Popular music
First recorded appearance of the English ballad Greensleeves.

Publications
Giammateo Asola – Second book of masses for four voices (Venice: Angelo Gardano), also includes a Requiem mass for two choirs
Lodovico Balbi – Masses for four and five voices (Venice: Angelo Gardano)
Anthoine de Bertrand
Joachim a Burck
 for four voices (Erfurt: Georg Baumann)
 for four voices (Mühlhausen: Georg Hantzsch)
Girolamo Diruta –  for five voices (Venice: Angelo Gardano)
Placido Falconio
 (Voices of the crowd) for four voices (Brescia: Vincenzo Sabbio), a collection of motets
 (Voices of Christ) for three voices (Brescia: Vincenzo Sabbio), a collection of motets
 for four voices (Brescia: Vincenzo Sabbio), a collection of responsories for Holy Week
 for four voices (Brescia: Vincenzo Sabbio), a setting of Lamentations
Andrea Gabrieli – Second book of madrigals for six voices (Venice: Angelo Gardano)
Jacobus Gallus
First book of masses for seven and eight voices (Prague: Georg Nigrinus)
First book of masses for six voices (Prague: Georg Nigrinus)
First book of masses for five voices (Prague: Georg Nigrinus)
First book of masses for four voice (Prague: Georg Nigrinus)
Mikołaj Gomółka –  for four voices (Kraków: Lazarus), a Polish psalter
Eucharius Hoffmann –  for four voices, part one (Rostock: Augustin Ferber)
Marc'Antonio Ingegneri – Third book of madrigals for five voices (Venice: Angelo Gardano)
Giorgio Mainerio –  for six voices (Venice: Angelo Gardano), a collection of Magnificats
Luca Marenzio – First book of madrigals for five voices (Venice: Angelo Gardano)
Tiburtio Massaino – Second book of motets for five voices (Venice: Angelo Gardano)
Claudio Merulo – First book of madrigals for three voices (Venice: Angelo Gardano)
Philippe de Monte
Fourth book of madrigals for six voices (Venice: Angelo Gardano)
Eighth book of madrigals for five voices (Venice: heirs of Girolamo Scotto)
Ninth book of madrigals for five voices (Venice: hiers of Girolamo Scotto)
Leonhard Päminger – , published posthumously in Nuremberg
Costanzo Porta –  (Book of Fifty-two Motets) for four, five, six, seven, and eight voices (Venice: Angelo Gardano)
Johann Wanning –  (first part of first cycle of sacred de tempore motets)

Births
July 6 – Johann Stobäus, German composer (d. 1646)
date unknown – Giovanni Girolamo Kapsperger, German-Italian performer and composer of lute, theorbo and chitarrone music (d. 1651)
probable
Michael East, English organist and composer (d. 1648)
Thomas Ford, English composer (d. 1648)
Adriana Basile, Italian composer (d. 1640)

Deaths
January 18 – Antonio Scandello, Italian composer (b. 1517)
April 1 – Alonso Mudarra, Spanish composer and vihuelist (b. c.1510)
September 15 – Geert van Turnhout, Flemish composer (b. c.1530)
November 30 – Richard Farrant, English composer of church music, choirmaster, playwright and theatrical producer (b. c.1530)

References

 
Music
1580
Music by year